Jurian Hobbel (born 12 February 2000) is a Dutch professional footballer who plays as a right-back for Derde Divisie club SteDoCo.

Club career
Hobbel started his career with Sparta Rotterdam, before moving to the FC Dordrecht academy on a free transfer in 2017. He made his senior debut three years later, playing the full 90 minutes in a 2–0 home win against AZ Alkmaar II.

On 2 May 2022, Hobbel joined SteDoCo competing in the fourth-tier Derde Divisie.

References

External links
 

2000 births
Living people
Dutch footballers
FC Dordrecht players
SteDoCo players
Eerste Divisie players
Association football defenders